Cristóvão Soares de Melo (died 1584) was a Portuguese colonial administrator. He was corregedor of Portuguese Cape Verde between 1577 and 1579. His predecessor was António Velho Tinoco and his successor  was Diogo Dias Magro.

See also
List of colonial governors of Cape Verde
History of Cape Verde

Notes

External links
Cabo Verde - Djarfogo 

Year of birth unknown
1584 deaths
Colonial heads of Cape Verde
Portuguese colonial governors and administrators